The 1971 Asian Basketball Confederation Championship for Men were held in Tokyo, Japan.

Results

Final standing

Awards

References
 Results
 archive.fiba.com

Asia Championship, 1971
1971
B
B
ABC
ABC